CMA CGM Marco Polo is a Bahamas-registered container ship of the  owned by the CMA CGM group. On 6 November 2012, it became the largest container ship in the world measured by capacity (16,020 TEU), but was surpassed on 24 February 2013 by the Maersk Triple E class (18,270 TEU), which is 4 metres (13.1 ft) longer at precisely 400m in length.

It is named for Venetian merchant and traveller Marco Polo.

The capacity is 10,000 TEU with an average payload of 14 tonnes, compared with 11,000 for Emma Mærsk and even more for the Triple E Class.

See also
 List of largest container ships
 List of longest ships

References

External links

 www.cmacgm-marcopolo.com
 CMA CGM MARCO POLO Blog
 Nine DSME Built Vessels Selected as Best Ships of 2012

Container ships
Marco Polo
Marco Polo
Ships built by Daewoo Shipbuilding & Marine Engineering
2012 ships